I'll Take Care of You is a duet album by American soul/gospel singers Cissy Houston and Chuck Jackson, released in 1992. It was issued by Shanachie Records, and contains their cover-versions of The Stylistics' "You Make Me Feel Brand New", Bob Marley's "Waiting in Vain", as well as Chuck Jackson's "I Don't Want to Cry".

Critical reception
The Globe and Mail wrote that "the results aren't flashy - no two octave runs or glass-shattering falsetto sweeps here - but the warmth of the two voices together and Jackson's subtle and powerful solo work make young 'uns like Whitney and Bobby Brown sound like pale pretenders to the soul throne." The Boston Globe wrote that "Houston and Jackson alternate leads and join on thrilling duets in this live-sounding disc done with minimal overdubs." The Washington Post deemed the album "a series of alternately intimate and rousing duets."

Track listing

Personnel
Doug Munro - arrangements, mixing
Stefan Grossman - art direction
Chuck Jackson, Cissy Houston - lead vocals
Amanda Homi, Chuck St. Troy, Diane Garisto, Lenora Zenzalai Helm, Nicki Richards, Vaneese Thomas - backing vocals
Wilbur Bascomb - bass
Tommy McDonnell - congas, backing vocals
Joan Pelosi - design
Bernard Purdie - drums
Hiram Bullock - electric guitar
Thom Leinbach - engineer
Gil Parris - guitar
Robert Vosgien - digital mastering
Randall Grass - mixing
Shari Weingarten - photography
Richard Tee - piano, organ
Peter Denenberg - producer, engineer, mixing
Joe Ferry - producer, mixing, acoustic guitar, percussion
Bruce Williamson - synthesizer, saxophone
Barry Danielian - trumpet, flugelhorn

Credits
Producers: Joe Ferry and Peter Deneberg

References

External links
Chuck Jackson, Cissy Houston-I'll Take Care of You (CD, Album)
Cissy Houston Bio page
Chuck Jackson -Official Website 

1992 albums
Cissy Houston albums
Chuck Jackson albums
Shanachie Records albums